Engineering is peer-reviewed open access academic journal of engineering launched in 2015 by the Chinese Academy of Engineering. It is published by Higher Education Press in China, while it is published by Elsevier internationally. The journal is edited by Raj Reddy (Carnegie Mellon University) and Ji Zhou (Chinese Academy of Engineering). The journal is indexed by Scopus and Science Citation Index Expanded.

References

External links

Engineering journals

Publications established in 2015